Charles Yosei Muneria (born 10 February 1996) is a Kenyan long-distance runner who competes in track and cross country running events. He represented his country at the 2016 Summer Olympics. He was an individual and team medallist at the African Cross Country Championships in 2016.

Muneria made his first high level forays in running at Moroccan road races, taking eighth at the 2014 Marrakesh 10K and the 2015 Rabat Half Marathon. A breakthrough over 10,000 metres followed at the Kenyan Athletics Championships in 2015, where he was runner-up in 27:54.6 minutes, though he was slower at the World Championships trials. He gained his first national selection after a fourth-place finish at the Kenyan Cross Country Championships. At the 2016 African Cross Country Championships he finished with a bronze medal, helping Kenya to the team gold medals alongside the winner James Gitahi Rungaru. He surprised with a runner-up finish in the 10,000 m at the 2016 Athletics Kenya Olympic Trials behind Paul Tanui. In an unusual selection decision, he was listed in the initial 10,000 m team, but was then entered in the shorter 5000 m race.

At the 2016 Rio Olympics he was one of three Kenyans, alongside Caleb Ndiku and Isiah Koech, who failed to progress to the Olympic 5000 metres final. This was the first time this had happened in Kenya's Olympic history since 1956. Former athletes were highly critical: 1988 Olympic champion John Ngugi said preparation was inadequate and the runners were not mentally prepared, while former world champion Benjamin Limo singled out Muneria's selection for the shorter track distance as a poor choice, saying Muneria "looked tactless".

Personal bests
5000 metres – 13:23.79 min (2016)
10,000 metres – 27:57.07 min (2016)

All information from All-Athletics profile.

International competitions

References

External links

Living people
1996 births
Kenyan male long-distance runners
Olympic athletes of Kenya
Athletes (track and field) at the 2016 Summer Olympics
Athletes (track and field) at the 2019 African Games
African Games competitors for Kenya